The Shuangliu Sports Center is a sports venue in Shuangliu District, Chengdu, Sichuan, China. Its construction cost 600 million yuan. It has a multi-purpose stadium named Shuangliu Sports Centre Stadium with a capacity of 26,000, and an indoor stadium with a capacity of 3,400. It also has five tennis courts and two basketball courts.

Shuangliu Sports Center hosted the former China League One football team Chengdu Tiancheng F.C. until the team folded in January 2015. A year later, it became the home stadium of the China League Two team Chengdu Qbao, which relocated from Nanjing.

Notable events
 Joker Xue – Skyscraper World Tour - 11 August 2018
 Jacky Cheung – A Classic Tour – 14–15 September 2018

References

Football venues in China
Multi-purpose stadiums in China
Buildings and structures in Chengdu
Sports venues in Chengdu
Football venues in Chengdu
Chengdu Tiancheng F.C.